Thomas William Owens (born June 28, 1949) is an American retired professional basketball player.

Early life 
A 6'9" center from the Bronx, New York, Owens played for LaSalle Academy and the University of South Carolina.

Career 
Owens played five seasons (1971–1976) in the American Basketball Association and seven seasons (1976–1983) in the National Basketball Association as a member of the Memphis Pros, Carolina Cougars, Spirits of St. Louis, Memphis Sounds, Kentucky Colonels, Indiana Pacers, San Antonio Spurs, Houston Rockets, Portland Trail Blazers, and Detroit Pistons. He scored 9,898 points and grabbed 5,985 rebounds in his ABA/NBA career.

References

External links
ABA/NBA stats
Italian League stats

1949 births
Living people
American expatriate basketball people in Italy
American men's basketball players
Basketball players from New York City
Carolina Cougars players
Centers (basketball)
Detroit Pistons players
Houston Rockets players
Indiana Pacers players
Kentucky Colonels players
Memphis Pros players
Memphis Sounds players
Portland Trail Blazers players
San Antonio Spurs players
San Diego Rockets draft picks
South Carolina Gamecocks men's basketball players
Spirits of St. Louis players
Sportspeople from the Bronx